Sahran bin Abdul Samad (born 5 February 1983 in Sabah) is a Malaysian footballer who plays as 
defender.

References

External links

1983 births
Living people
Malaysian footballers
People from Sandakan
Association football defenders
Sarawak FA players
Kuching City F.C. players
Malaysia Premier League players